Eduar Ayrton Preciado García (born 17 July 1994) is an Ecuadorian professional footballer who plays as a forward for Liga MX club Santos Laguna and the Ecuador national team.

International career

International goals
Scores and results list Ecuador's goal tally first.

References

External links

Bio at goal.com

1994 births
Living people
Association football forwards
Ecuadorian footballers
Ecuadorian expatriate footballers
Ecuadorian Serie A players
Liga Portugal 2 players
S.D. Quito footballers
C.D. Trofense players
Leixões S.C. players
C.S. Emelec footballers
Santos Laguna footballers
Liga MX players
Expatriate footballers in Mexico
Expatriate footballers in Portugal
Ecuadorian expatriate sportspeople in Portugal
Sportspeople from Esmeraldas, Ecuador
Ecuador international footballers
2019 Copa América players
2021 Copa América players
2022 FIFA World Cup players